Ernst Rudolf "Stumpen" Eklund (22 July 1894 – 5 May 1952) was a Swedish diver who competed in the 1912 Summer Olympics.

He finished third in his first round heat of the 3 metre springboard event and did not advance to the final. He also competed in the 10 metre platform event. Here he finished fourth in his first round heat and did not advance to the final again.

References

1894 births
1952 deaths
Swedish male divers
Olympic divers of Sweden
Divers at the 1912 Summer Olympics
20th-century Swedish people